The Magar-class landing ships are amphibious warfare vessels of the Indian Navy, currently in active service. Only two ships of the class were designed and built by Hindustan Shipyard Limited, with fitting completed at Garden Reach Shipbuilders and Engineers.

History
The design of the class is based on the  ships formerly operated by the Royal Navy. They can operate two medium-lift helicopters, which are primarily meant for inserting small teams of special forces (e.g. MARCOS). To discharge a ship's cargo and most of the troops, it needs to be beached, so that it can utilize its bow-door, similar to an LST.

The ships are stationed at the naval base in Visakhapatnam on India's east coast.

Ships

See also
List of active Indian Navy ships

References 

 
Amphibious warfare vessels of India
Ships built in India
Amphibious warfare vessel classes